This is a list of Irish Sport Horses that have won medals or been placed at the highest levels of eventing. Including the Olympic Games, Eventing World Championship, European Eventing Championships, Eventing World Cup and the Pan-American Games.

{| class="wikitable" 
|- 
! style="color: white; background-color: green;" width=170|Achievement
! style="color: white; background-color: green;" width=180|Rider
! style="color: white; background-color: green;" width=140|Horse
! style="color: white; background-color: green;" width=160|Sire
! style="color: white; background-color: green;" width=60|Dam
! style="color: white; background-color: green;" width=130|Dam's sire
|-
| align=center | 1996 Olympic Team Silver
| align=center | 
| align=center | Giltedge
| align=center | Glenbar (ISH)
| align=center | Kitty
| align=center | 
|-
| align=center | 2000 Olympic Individual Gold
| align=center | 
| align=center | Custom Made
| align=center | Bassompierre (xx)
| align=center | Purple Heather (ISH)
| align=center | Ben Purple (RID)
|-
| align=center | 2000 Olympic Team Silver
| align=center | 
| align=center | Over To You
| align=center | Over The River (xx)
| align=center | Another Miller
| align=center | 
|-
| align=center | 2000 Olympic Team Silver
| align=center | 
| align=center | Supreme Rock
| align=center | Edmund Burke  (xx)
| align=center | Rineen Classic (ISH)
| align=center | Bassompierre (xx)
|-
| align=center | 2000 Olympic Team Bronze
| align=center | 
| align=center | Giltedge
| align=center | Glenbar (ISH)
| align=center | Kitty
| align=center | 
|-
| align=center | 2004 Olympic Individual Gold
| align=center | 
| align=center | Shear L'Eau
| align=center | Stan the Man (xx)
| align=center | Starry Night II (ISH)
| align=center | Carnival Night (xx)
|-
| align=center | 2004 Olympic Team Silver
| align=center | 
| align=center | Over To You
| align=center | Over The River (xx)
| align=center | Another Miller
| align=center | 
|-
| align=center | 2008 Olympic Individual Silver
| align=center | 
| align=center | McKinlaigh
| align=center | Highland King (ISH)
| align=center | Kilcumney Hostess (ISH)
| align=center | Stetchworth Lad (xx)
|-
| align=center | 2008 Olympic Team Gold
| align=center | 
| align=center | Mr. Medicott
| align=center | Cruising (ISH)
| align=center | Slieveluachra (ISH)
| align=center | Edmund Burke (xx)
|-
| align=center | 2008 Olympic Team Silver
| align=center | 
| align=center | Ben Along Time
| align=center | Cavalier Royale (HOLST)
| align=center | Campaigner’s Dream (ISH)
| align=center | Campaigner (xx)
|-
| align=center | 2008 Olympic Team Silver
| align=center | 
| align=center | Irish Jester
| align=center | Irish Enough (ISH)
| align=center | Yellow Empress (TBX)
| align=center |
|-
| align=center | 2008 Olympic Team Bronze
| align=center | 
| align=center | Call Again Cavalier
| align=center | Cavalier Royale (HOLST)
| align=center | Woodlands Lady (ISH)
| align=center | Aristocracy (xx)
|-
| align=center | 2008 Olympic Team Bronze
| align=center | 
| align=center | Parkmore Ed
| align=center | Parkmore Night (ISH)
| align=center | Bodalmore Lass (ISH)
| align=center | Diamonds are Trumps (RID)
|-
| align=center | 2008 Olympic Team Bronze
| align=center | 
| align=center | Spring Along
| align=center | Pallas Digion (ISH)
| align=center | Miss Buck (ISH)
| align=center | Master Buck (xx)
|-
| align=center | 2008 Olympic Team Bronze
| align=center | 
| align=center | Tankers Town
| align=center | Diamond Clover (RID)
| align=center | Money Gone West (xx)
| align=center | Bulldozer (xx)
|-
|}

References 
Irish Horse Board (IHB) Olympic news
 Irish Draught blood
Eventing Ireland (EI)
All Breed search
Sporthorse Breed database

See also

Irish Sport Horse
List of ISH Showjumpers

Individual warmbloods